Eylau was ordered as one of fourteen second-rank, 100-gun sailing  for the French Navy, but was converted to a 90-gun steam-powered ship in the 1850s while under construction. Completed in 1857 the ship participated in the Second Italian War of Independence in 1859 and the initial stages of the Second French intervention in Mexico before she was converted into a troopship in 1862 or 1863. Eylau was hulked in 1877 and served as a barracks ship until she was scrapped in 1905.

Description
The Hector-class ships were enlarged versions of the 80-gun  ships of the line that had been designed by naval architect Jacques-Noël Sané. The conversion to steam power involved cutting the ship's frame in half amidships and building a new section to house the propulsion machinery and coal bunkers, which reduced her armament to 90 guns. Her crew numbered 913 officers and ratings. Details are lacking on Eylaus propulsion machinery, the only information available is that her two steam engines were rated at 900 nominal horsepower and produced .

The ship's consisted of eighteen 36-pounder smoothbore cannon and sixteen  Paixhans guns on the lower gundeck and thirty-four 30-pounder  cannon on the upper gundeck. On the quarterdeck and forecastle were twenty 30-pounder cannon and a pair of  rifled muzzle-loading guns.

Construction and career
The ship was ordered in the early 1830s under the name Éole and was laid down at the Arsenal de Toulon in August 1833. She was renamed Eylau on 23 November 1839 and was ordered to be converted to steam power on 13 November 1852. The conversion began on 5 July 1852 and the ship was launched on 15 May 1856. The ship was commissioned on 8 March 1857. She was used as a hulk in Toulon from 1877, and broken up in 1905.

Citations

References

Ships of the line of the French Navy
Eylau
1856 ships
Victorian-era ships of the line